The Huiquanpu Formation is a geological formation in Shanxi and Hebei provinces, China, whose strata date back to the Late Cretaceous period. It predominantly consists of purple-red mudstone, with subordinate grey-white sandy conglomerates.

Dinosaur remains are among the fossils that have been recovered from the formation.

Vertebrate paleofauna 
 Huabeisaurus allocotus — Teeth [and] postcranial skeleton; Cenomanian to Campanian stages.
 Tianzhenosaurus youngi — "Skull [and] postcranial skeleton."
 Datonglong tianzhenensis — Tianzhen.
 Shanxia tianzhenensis — "Partial skull."
 Jinbeisaurus wangi — "Maxilla, dentary and fragmentary postcrania."

See also 
 List of dinosaur-bearing rock formations

References 

Geologic formations of China
Upper Cretaceous Series of Asia
Cretaceous China
Campanian Stage
Cenomanian Stage
Coniacian Stage
Santonian Stage
Turonian Stage
Conglomerate formations
Sandstone formations
Siltstone formations
Fluvial deposits
Paleontology in Shanxi
Paleontology in Hebei